The Battle Wizard is a 1977 Hong Kong film adapted from Louis Cha's novel Demi-Gods and Semi-Devils. The film was produced by the Shaw Brothers Studio and directed by Pao Hsueh-li. The film centers on the story of Duan Yu, one of the three protagonists of the novel.

Cast
 Danny Lee as Duan Yu
  as Mu Wanqing / Xiang Yaocha
 Lam Jan-kei as Zhong Ling
 Si Wai as Duan Zhengchun
 Shut Chung-tin as unnamed antagonist based on Duan Yanqing's characteristic, but here he is Qin Hongmian's husband
 Wai Wang as Duan Zhengming
 Kong Do as Yue Canglong (combination of Yue Laosan and Yun Zhonghe)
 Keung Hon as Sikong Xuan
 Sun Shu-wah as Zhong Wanchou
 Hung Ling-ling as Dao Baifeng
 Kam Lau as Qin Hongmian
 Teresa Ha as Gan Baobao
 Norman Chui as Gu Ducheng
 Yeung Chak-lam as Chu Wanli
 Ko Hung
 Leung Seung-wan
 Yuen Cheung-yan
 Wong Pau-kei
 Wong Cheung
 San Kuai
 Yuen Wah
 Corey Yuen
 Chui Fat
 Yuen Shun-yi
 Wong Chi-keung
 Chan Kwok-kuen
 Hao Li-jen
 Lam Fung
 Koo Chim-hung
 Lui Tat
 Chai Lam
Kong Chuen
Ting Tung
Yuen Jan-yeung
Chan Siu-kai
Law Keung

External links
 
 

1977 films
Films based on works by Jin Yong
Hong Kong martial arts films
Films based on Demi-Gods and Semi-Devils
Wuxia films
Shaw Brothers Studio films
Films set in the Liao dynasty
Films set in the Western Xia
1970s Hong Kong films